SS Mariposa was a luxury ocean liner launched in 1931, one of four ships in the Matson Lines "White Fleet", which included , , and . She was later renamed SS Homeric.

Building
The Bethlehem Shipbuilding Corporation built Mariposa at Quincy, Massachusetts, completing her in December 1931. She had twin screws, each driven by three steam turbines via single reduction gearing.

Career with Matson Lines
Mariposa was designed for service in the Pacific Ocean, including regular stops in ports along the West Coast of the United States, Hawaii, Samoa, Fiji, New Zealand, and Australia. Her maiden voyage began 16 January 1932 in New York City, where she sailed to Havana, transited the Panama Canal, and berthed in the Port of Los Angeles before continuing on to tour 10 more countries in the south and west Pacific.

War service
In World War II, she operated under the War Shipping Administration with allocation and close association with the US Army, though not officially a US Army Transport, serving as a fast troop carrier, bringing supplies and support forces to distant shores and rescuing persons stranded in foreign countries by the outbreak of war.

War voyages
26 December 1941: Se left Honolulu, Hawaii, loaded with some military personnel and many military dependents accompanied by a destroyer escort, and arrived in San Francisco 1 January 1942.
12 January 1942: Mariposa left San Francisco in the "Australian — Suva" convoy escorted by two destroyers and the light cruiser  with two other troopships SS President Coolidge and the [[USS President Monroe (AP-104)|SS President Monroe]] (destined for Suva). This was the first large convoy to Australia after Pearl Harbor with Mariposa transporting Army personnel, ammunition and, combined with Coolidge, fifty P-40 fighters intended for the Philippines and Java. The thirteen officers selected by the War Department to form the core of what was to become MacArthur's headquarters in the Southwest Pacific Area Command being formed in Australia as United States Army Forces in Australia (USAFIA), known as the "Remember Pearl Harbor" Group, were embarked in Coolidge and Mariposa. Most troops and equipment were intended to be sent on from Australia to the American-British-Dutch-Australian Command (ABDA) area after the Australian bound ships reached Melbourne on 1 February 1942. 35th Pursuit Group commander Clinton D. "Casey" Vincent was aboard.McClure, Glenn E. Fire and Fall Back: the World War Two "CBI" story of "Casey" Vincent, p. 18. Universal City, Texas. Barnes Press. 1975. Also on board was the 'Brownout Strangler', Private Edward Leonski.
19 March 1942: She left San Francisco for Australia in a convoy that included .
18 April 1942: She left Melbourne, Australia, for the US, carrying Dutch military personnel who had evacuated Java after the loss to the Japanese Imperial Army; she arrived 3 May 1942 in San Francisco. 
28 May 1942: She left Charleston, South Carolina, stopping in Freetown for a week and Cape Town for a short stay before heading for Karachi.
September 1942: She arrived at Karachi. Mariposa arrived in New York City in early September with more than 100 American Volunteer Group (Flying Tigers) pilots and ground personnel aboard. They had been denied transport back to the United States on half-empty transport planes by the US Ferry Command. 
21 December 1942: left Newport News, Virginia unescorted carrying 5,000 military passengers
3 January 1943: Overnight refueling at Rio de Janeiro
26 January 1943: Aden for overnight refueling
27 January 1943: She disembarked outside Massawa
27 February 1943: Disembarked at Bombay
10 April 1943: Arrived at New York City
15 April 1943: Left Brooklyn Navy Yard for Casablanca carrying military medical units and troops including some Tuskegee Airmen
24 April 1943: Arrived at Casablanca, French Morocco
 Mid-November 1943: Left Sydney Harbour bound for San Francisco, for a 16-day cruise. Among the passengers was prominent Dutch pilot Ivan Smirnov (Romanized to "Smirnoff"). No convoy was used.
10 December 1943: She departed Los Angeles for Hobart, Tasmania, with 4,500 railroad troops, with no escort. During the voyage, the men were near-mutinous due to bad food.
26 December 1943: Docked at Hobart
early 1944: Docked  at Bombay
9 March 1944: Departed Los Angeles
8 April 1944: Arrived Bombay
13 April 1944: Left Bombay for Boston
23 May 1944: Arrived at Boston
Spring 1944: New York to North Africa
8 August 1944: Left Boston for Liverpool with no escort
14 August 1944: Arrived at Liverpool
30 August 1944: Left Boston for Liverpool, sailed alone
7 September 1944: Arrived Liverpool
1 December 1944: Left Boston for Marseilles, sailed alone
10 December 1944: Arrived Marseilles
8 January 1945: Left Boston for Marseilles
18 January 1945: Arrived Marseilles
7 May 1945: En route to the US on VE Day
17 October 1945: Left Le Havre for Boston bringing troops home
24 October 1945: Arrived at Boston

1946 Australia/New Zealand dependent voyages from Australia
20 February 1946 (WSA operation): Departed Brisbane with 882 dependents
11 April 1946 (WSA operation): Departed Brisbane with 769 dependents
31 May 1946 (WSA operation): Departed Brisbane with 802 dependents
11 July 1946 (WSA operation): Departed Sydney with 230 dependents

Career with Home Lines
In 1947, the ship was mothballed for six years at Union Iron Works in Alameda, California. Her engines were overhauled by Todd San Francisco Division. Home Lines bought her and renamed her SS Homeric, sailing her to Trieste for reconstruction to allow 1243 passengers: 147 first class and 1,096 tourist class. Her gross register tonnage increased to 18,563, and total length increased to 641 ft (195.5 m). Home Lines operated her beginning 24 January 1955 for liner service between ports in the north Atlantic.

On 18 August 1956, Homerics bow struck the side of the Greek Line ship Columbia in fog in Quebec. At the time, tugs were towing Homeric and Columbia was moored at a pier. About  of Columbias starboard side were damaged, and some of her lifeboats were crushed.

SS Homeric was reassigned to intra-Caribbean cruises. In 1973, a major fire destroyed much of her galley and restaurant, and she was scrapped in Taiwan next to Holland America Line SS Nieuw Amsterdam in 1974. During the ship breaking process, her sister ship, the Chandris Lines' Ellinis (ex-Lurline), suffered major engine damage on a cruise to Japan; Chandris was able to purchase one of the Mariposa'' engines from the ship breakers.

See also
SS Mariposa (1883)
SS Manoa (1913)
SS Malolo (1926)
SS Monterey (1931)
SS Lurline (1932)

Notes

References

Further reading

External links

Home Lines ocean liner and cruise ship postcards and photographs
Matson Lines 1930s brochure
Photos of twin funnel ships including SS Homeric

1931 ships
Cruise ships of the United States
Maritime incidents in 1956
Ocean liners
Passenger ships of the United States
Ships built in Quincy, Massachusetts
Steamships of the United States
Troop ships of the War Shipping Administration
World War II merchant ships of the United States